Strictly Come Dancing (informally known as Strictly) is a British  dance contest show in which celebrities partner with professional dancers to compete in mainly ballroom and Latin dance. Each couple is scored by a panel of usually 4 judges. The title of the show is a continuation of the long-running series Come Dancing. The format has been exported to 60 other countries—under the title Dancing with the Stars—licensed by BBC Worldwide, and led to a modern dance-themed spin-off Strictly Dance Fever. The Guinness World Records named Strictly to be the world's most successful reality television format in 2010. The series is currently presented by Tess Daly and Claudia Winkleman. Bruce Forsyth co-presented the series with Daly until 2014.

The series has been broadcast on BBC One since 15 May 2004, typically on Saturday evenings with a following Sunday night results show. From series 2 onwards, the show has been broadcast in the run up to Christmas. With its high viewing figures, Strictly Come Dancing has become a significant programme on British television. Eighteen stand-alone Christmas specials and nineteen charity specials have also been produced.

Development
Producer Richard Hopkins, who had produced the first UK series of Big Brother, unsuccessfully pitched the idea of a modern Come Dancing to the BBC under the title of Pro-Celebrity Dancing in 2003. Later, entertainment executive Fenia Vardanis also suggested reviving Come Dancing, so Jane Lush, the then head of BBC Entertainment, put Hopkins and Vardanis together to develop the show.

Hopkins then called in Karen Smith, who had just produced Comic Relief Does Fame Academy for BBC One and The Games for Channel 4, to help lead the development of the show and launch the series. Smith was the show-running Executive Producer of the first three series, and of sister show It Takes Two. She then took the role of Creative Director of BBC Entertainment whilst still overseeing series 4 and 5.

Hopkins later took the format to America himself when the BBC dismissed the idea of selling it abroad, as they felt it was too British.

The title is an amalgamation of the titles of both the 1992 Australian film Strictly Ballroom and Come Dancing.

Format
From series 1 to 11, Sir Bruce Forsyth and Tess Daly presented the pro-celebrity ballroom dancing competition. From series 8 to 11, Forsyth only presented the main show and was replaced for the results show by Claudia Winkleman, at which point Daly assumed Forsyth's role as main presenter and Winkleman assumed Daly's role as co-presenter. Winkleman has joined Daly as full-time co-presenter for series 12 following Forsyth's departure after the 2013 series. Through telephone voting, viewers vote for who they would like to be in the next round, the results of the poll being combined with the ranking of the judges. For example, with ten contestants left, the judges' favourite would receive ten points, second favourite nine points, and so on, and similarly with the viewers' rankings. The bottom ranked couple gets one point. The profits from the telephone lines were donated to Sport Relief in series 1, to Children in Need from series 2, until series 8 when donations to charity stopped.

The show is broadcast live on BBC One on Saturday evenings, and is currently presented by Tess Daly and Claudia Winkleman (with Zoe Ball covering for Winkleman for a number of weeks in 2014). Sir Bruce Forsyth presented the live shows alongside Daly from 2004 to 2013, announcing his departure in 2014. He was to continue to present special editions of the show. For most of the second series, Natasha Kaplinsky stood in temporarily for Daly while she took maternity leave; Claudia Winkleman hosted the results show and editions that Forsyth had missed between 2010 and 2013. The judging panel initially consisted of Bruno Tonioli, Arlene Phillips, Len Goodman and Craig Revel Horwood. Alesha Dixon took Phillips' place from series 7 to 9, after which she left the programme to judge Britain's Got Talent which led retired ballerina Dame Darcey Bussell to replace her. Bussell remained a judge alongside Goodman (until he was replaced by Shirley Ballas in 2017), Tonioli and Horwood until 2018. Up until 2020, Tonioli commuted weekly between Hollywood and London to judge both the American and British versions of the show simultaneously- however, due the outbreak of COVID-19 in 2020, he could no longer juggle both the UK and US shows- he was not replaced for the 2020 series; but pro dancer Anton Du Beke took his place from the 2021 series, and has now replaced Bruno full-time on the panel. Each judge gives the performance a mark out of ten, giving an overall total out of forty. The voice-over announcer is Alan Dedicoat. During series four, an hour-long highlights show was shown on Sundays at 19:00 on BBC Two, and during series five and six, the results show moved to Sunday evenings, although it was filmed on Saturday and then broadcast "as live" on the Sunday.

The singers on the show are Tommy Blaize, Hayley Sanderson, Lance Ellington, Andrea Grant and, formerly, the well-known British dance music vocalist Tara McDonald. The music director is David Arch. Tommy Blaize has been part of Strictly since its beginning. David Arch joined in the fourth series and Hayley Sanderson in the fifth. In the seventeenth series, the singers were joined by Mitchell.

The show was broadcast from a specially constructed set at BBC Television Centre (primarily in the largest studio, TC1) until its closure in 2013, with the show moving to Elstree Studios' George Lucas Stage 2 from 2013 onwards. However, in the first two series, shows were also filmed at the Tower Ballroom in Blackpool, where the original Come Dancing series was filmed in the 1970s.

In the second series, two shows were filmed at the Tower Ballroom — show five and the Grand Final, which was broadcast live on 11 December 2004. In 2005 though the BBC announced that they would not be returning to the venue for the third series due to "logistical problems". In October 2008, Craig Revel Horwood called for the series to return to the Tower Ballroom, saying, "The atmosphere was electric. It's huge and has so much history. The Tower Ballroom puts a lot of pressure on the professionals and the celebrities to perform to the best of their potential. What a wonderful place to go live to 12 million people. We have got to get the BBC to bring Strictly Come Dancing back to Blackpool." Eventually, for series 7, the show did return to the Tower Ballroom, where Blackpool-born Craig Kelly was eliminated. The episode was aired live on 7 November 2009. Strictly Come Dancing returned to Blackpool for the 2010 and 2011 series. After series 10, when Strictly Come Dancing did not go to Blackpool, they announced that they would return for series 11.

Presenters and judges

Presenter timeline
Colour key

Judges timeline
Colour key

Professional dancers

Key:
 Winner of the series
 Runner-up of the series
 Third place of the series
 Fourth place finalist of the series
 First elimination of the series
 Withdrew or quit in the series
 Participating in current series
 Did not receive a celebrity partner

Current

Former

Notes and statistics
 Anton Du Beke remains the longest-serving professional dancer, taking part from series 1 to series 18. In the fourth and fifth weeks of series 18, he was a guest judge while regular judge Motsi Mabuse was self-isolating, before taking on the role officially in series 19 due to the absence of Bruno Tonioli.
 Four professionals have won during their first series on the show: Brendan Cole (Series 1), Darren Bennett (Series 2), Artem Chigvintsev (Series 8) and Aljaž Škorjanec (series 11). Jowita Przystał (series 20) won with her first celebrity partner, having already been a part of the show’s previous series.
 Four professionals have won during their last series on the show: Camilla Dallerup (Series 6), Flavia Cacace (series 10), Aliona Vilani (series 13) and Joanne Clifton (series 14).
 Following his departure from the professional cast, Ian Waite made regular appearances on the companion programme It Takes Two until 2020. Waite and Darren Bennett both participated in the professional dance troupe in series 8, and Waite stood in as a temporary dance partner in series 8 due to the unavailability of Brendan Cole.
 Iveta Lukosiute initially joined the show to partner Johnny Ball in series 10 after his original partner, Aliona Vilani, was injured in training. She then became part of the main cast for series 11.
 In series 11, having previously been announced to be leaving the show, Vilani subsequently replaced Natalie Lowe, who was injured before the start of the series. The producers of the show announced this on 2 September 2013.
 Vilani is the only professional to have been eliminated first twice in a row, with Tony Jacklin in series 11 and Gregg Wallace in series 12.
 Vilani & Oti Mabuse are the only professionals to have won more than one series. Mabuse is the only professional to have won twice in a row.
 Kevin Clifton has had the most appearances in the final of any professional, with five (2013–16, 2018). He is also the only pro to have reached more than two finals in a row, appearing in four consecutive finals in total.
 Since series 13, the show has had more professional dancers than celebrities to partner them with. In this and in subsequent series, the following professionals have been without celebrity partners:
 Series 13: Joanne Clifton
 Series 14 and 15: Neil Jones and Chloe Hewitt
 Series 16: Neil Jones, Luba Mushtuk and Johannes Radebe
 Series 17: Graziano Di Prima, Gorka Márquez and Nancy Xu
 Series 18: Nadiya Bychkova, Graziano Di Prima, Neil Jones and Nancy Xu
 Series 19: Luba Mushtuk, Jowita Przystał and Cameron Lombard
 Series 20: Neil Jones, Luba Mushtuk, Cameron Lombard, Lauren Oakley and Michelle Tsiakkas
 As of series 19, Chloe Hewitt is the only professional to have left the cast without ever having a celebrity partner.
 After suffering an injury, Neil Jones was unable to dance with his celebrity partner Alex Scott in weeks 6 and 7 of series 17. He continued to choreograph Scott's dances, while Kevin Clifton temporarily partnered her until Jones recovered.

Professional partners
Over the years, many dancers from the show have formed both professional and personal partnerships, dancing together competitively, on the show, or both. Darren Bennett and Lilia Kopylova are married, as are James and Ola Jordan and Aljaž Škorjanec and Janette Manrara, who became engaged after joining the show in 2013 and were married in 2017. Matthew and Nicole Cutler are divorced but remain professional partners; Karen Hauer and Kevin Clifton were engaged when Clifton entered the show in 2013 and were married prior to the 2015 series, before divorcing in 2018, while Neil and Katya Jones entered the show as a married couple before separating in 2019. Anton Du Beke and Erin Boag have danced as a professional couple since 1997, while Vincent Simone and Flavia Cacace are former Argentine Tango world champions as a duo and have done multiple tours together. Brendan Cole and Camilla Dallerup danced together for many years, including a stint in the original series of Come Dancing; following their split in 2004, Cole and Katya Virshilas formed a professional partnership, before parting in November 2009. Other current and former professional partnerships featured on the show include Dallerup and Ian Waite, Paul Killick and Hanna Karttunen, Andrew Cuerden and Hanna Haarala, Brian Fortuna and Kristina Rihanoff, Rihanoff and Robin Windsor, Pasha Kovalev and Anya Garnis, siblings Kevin and Joanne Clifton, AJ Pritchard and Chloe Hewitt, and Gorka Márquez and Karen Hauer.

Presentation

Dances
On average, dances last for approximately 90 seconds. Musical accompaniment is provided by The Strictly Come Dancing Band.
 The Waltz, Cha Cha Cha, Quickstep, Rumba, Tango, Jive, Foxtrot, Paso Doble and Samba have all been danced since series 1.
 The American Smooth and Viennese Waltz were added in series 3.
 The Salsa and Argentine Tango were added in series 4.
 No more dances were added until series 7, in week 11, when couples performed either a Charleston (which winner Chris Hollins chose to perform again in the final) or a Rock N' Roll routine. The final also featured a head-to-head Lindyhop. Of these dances, only the Charleston was retained for subsequent series, although elements of the Lindyhop have often featured in Showdances.
 Series 8 introduced the Swing-a-thon, where all remaining couples danced Swing simultaneously and were voted off the dancefloor one by one by the judges until only one couple remained. This returned in series 9 and 11.
 The tenth series featured a "Dance Fusion", in which the couples attempted to perform two dances consecutively in one routine.
 The twelfth series introduced the Waltz-a-thon, which used the same manner as the Swing-a-thon: all remaining couples danced the Waltz on the dance floor at the same time. Afterwards, the results were revealed by the judges.
 The thirteenth series introduced a Quickstep-a-thon, in which all seven remaining couples simultaneously danced the Quickstep. The judges then ranked them from one to seven and gave points accordingly.
 The fourteenth series saw the Cha-Cha-Challenge introduced, in which all six remaining couples simultaneously danced the Cha-Cha-Cha. The judges then ranked them from one to six and gave points accordingly.
 The fifteenth series saw the Paso Doble-thon introduced, in which all seven remaining couples simultaneously performed a Paso Doble. The judges then ranked them one to seven and gave points accordingly.
 The sixteenth series saw the Lindy-Hop-athon introduced, in which all seven remaining couples simultaneously performed the Lindy Hop. The judges then ranked them from one to seven and gave points accordingly.
 The sixteenth series introduced Contemporary, Jazz, and Street/Commercial dances as part of a "couples' choice" category.
 A Showdance (Freestyle) has always been performed in the series final as a last chance for couples to impress the public. From series 2 to 7, the Showdance was not scored by the judges. From series 8 to series 18, and again in series 20, the Showdance was performed as each couple's second dance in the final.

Prior to series 10, the dances performed in the early weeks were switched between one Ballroom and one Latin, and were divided as evenly as possible depending on the number of contestants left. As the competition progressed further, this system was abandoned and many styles, not just two, could be performed in one week by each of the remaining contestants. From series 4 to 7, the remaining contestants who made it to the semi-final were granted to perform the semi-final-exclusive Argentine Tango. As of series 10, the contestants are now allowed to perform any of the chosen dances in any week, though the Argentine Tango remains generally reserved for the latter stages of the competition. The Showdance, however, continues to only be performed in the final.

Coaching
As of series four, coaches are Jaclyn Spencer and Chris Marques (aka Cuban Groove) for Salsa and Mambo, and Jenny Thomas and Ryan Francois for Swing, Jive, Rock N’ Roll and The Charleston. The Argentine Tango coaches in series three were Flavia Cacace and Vincent Simone, both of whom have subsequently competed in the show.

Results show

From series 1 to 4, the results show was shown live on Saturday night one hour after the performances.

As of series 5, the results show is recorded on the Saturday night directly after the live show and incorporates the result of the viewers' votes, which are completed by 21:30. This was confirmed by the official BBC website in 2008:

Throughout the Sunday results show, the presenters refer to 'Saturday night' in reference to the main show due to the timing of the Sunday programme, and the outfits of Tess Daly, Claudia Winkleman and the judges are changed to present an illusion of a second live broadcast.

For series 7, the Sunday results show was axed and put back to Saturday nights as a result of a revamp of the show. It then reverted to Sundays from series 8.

Dance-off

A new system called the Dance-off, which takes place in the results show, was introduced in series 5. It continued until series 7, but did not return in series 8. It was then reinstated in series 10 and has remained a feature of the show ever since.

There Dance-off consists of the two couples who received the lowest totals that week from the combined judges' scores and public vote. The aim of the dance-off is for the couples to convince the judges that they deserve to go through to the following week's competition. Before they attempt their dance a second time, the couples sometimes get advice from the judges. The judges then decide which couple remains in the competition based on the dance-off performances. If three of the judges agree that one of the couples should be saved, that couple is through to the following week's competition and the Head Judge's vote is not counted. If one couple has two votes and the other couple has one vote, then the deciding vote is cast by the Head Judge, originally Len Goodman and currently Shirley Ballas. Afterwards, the eliminated couple perform one final dance — sometimes known as "waltzing out of the ballroom". The Monday after their elimination, they appear on It Takes Two to discuss their time on the programme.

On two occasions, the dance-off was cancelled; firstly, in series 14, in which one of the celebrity contestants, Anastacia, sustained an injury and was unable to compete in the Dance-off as a result. Under the rules of the show, the couple with the lowest combined total was eliminated. The second occasion in which the Dance-off was cancelled was in Series 20, again due to an injury sustained by Tony Adams. Tess Daly announced on the results show that Adams had decided to withdraw from the competition as a result of being unable to compete in the Dance-off.

It Takes Two

During the run of Strictly Come Dancing, Strictly Come Dancing: It Takes Two is broadcast each weeknight on BBC Two. The series was previously hosted by Claudia Winkleman but, due to her pregnancy in 2011, she had to leave the series, and was replaced by Zoe Ball, who hosted the show from Series 9 to 18. Rylan Clark-Neal joined as co-host in series 17. In May 2021, it was announced that Ball was to leave the show after 10 years, and on 10 June 2021, her replacement was confirmed to be former professional Janette Manrara.

The show features reviews of the performances during the previous Saturday's show and interviews with, and training footage of, the couples preparing for the next show. The judges and other celebrities also provide their opinions on how the couples are progressing. It Takes Two replaced Strictly Come Dancing on Three, hosted by Justin Lee Collins, which ran on BBC Three during the first series. Prior to 2010, BBC Two Scotland aired the programme on four nights only, running its own Gaelic-language programming on Thursdays instead.

Series overview

Series 1 (2004)

In Spring 2004, Strictly Come Dancing commenced its first series. The professional dancers were Brendan Cole, Hanna Karttunen, Anton Du Beke, Erin Boag, John Byrnes, Paul Killick, Camilla Dallerup and Kylie Jones. This was the only series to air in the Spring/Summer (as of series 2, the programme airs from September/October to December each year). Natasha Kaplinsky and Brendan Cole were crowned the first winners. At 8 weeks, this was the shortest series.

Series 2 (2004)

In Autumn 2004, the second series commenced. Five of the eight original professionals returned: these were Brendan Cole, Anton Du Beke, Erin Boag, Paul Killick and Camilla Dallerup. There were also five new professionals: Darren Bennett, Ian Waite, Lilia Kopylova, Nicole Cutler and Hazel Newberry. This was the only series Newberry participated in, while the other professionals competed in the following series.

A new spin-off show called Strictly Come Dancing: It Takes Two presented by Claudia Winkleman was created this series and has continued to air alongside each following series, now hosted by Rylan Clark-Neal and former professional dancer, Janette Manrara on BBC Two.

Series 3 (2005)

In 2005, the third series commenced. Brendan Cole, Anton Du Beke, Erin Boag, Camilla Dallerup, Darren Bennett, Ian Waite and Lilia Kopylova returned from the second series. Nicole Cutler, Paul Killick and Hazel Newberry did not return. They were replaced by Karen Hardy, Hanna Haarala, Izabela Hannah, Andrew Cuerden and Matthew Cutler.

Series 4 (2006)

The fourth series ran from 7 October to 23 December 2006. More than 12 million votes were cast, raising £1.5 million for Children in Need. A peak of 13 million viewers tuned into the final show of series four to see Mark Ramprakash and Karen Hardy crowned 2006 Strictly Come Dancing champions.

This series introduced four new professional dancers: Flavia Cacace, James Jordan, Ola Jordan and Vincent Simone. Andrew Cuerden, Hanna Haarala and Izabela Hannah did not return to the programme. This series also saw the return of Nicole Cutler, who had taken part in series 2 but not in series 3.

Series 5 (2007)

The fifth series of Strictly Come Dancing began on BBC One on 29 September 2007, with Bruce Forsyth and Tess Daly returning as presenters. For the first and only time, the lineup of professionals was unchanged from the previous series. The first programme was a catch-up show and preview of the new series, before the start of the competition on 6 October, which ran for 12 weeks. This was the first time two married couples competed against each other.

The show featured 14 new celebrities, who were paired with 14 professional dancers. In a change to the previous format, the results show was recorded on Saturday and broadcast on Sunday, rather than shown live later on Saturday. In addition to this, the two couples who were at the bottom of the table after the public vote were subject to a dance-off, where they reprised their routine for the judges to decide who should leave the competition. Head Judge Len Goodman had the casting vote in the event of a tie. The series raised just over one million pounds for Children in Need.

Series 6 (2008)

A sixth series of the programme was confirmed after the dancers' pay dispute was called off in late June 2008. This series was the longest to date, lasting for 14 weeks. The series introduced three new professional dancers, Brian Fortuna, Hayley Holt and Kristina Rihanoff. Nicole Cutler did not return to the show.

The sixth series began on 13 September with a behind-the-scenes look at the new series, followed by the first live show on 20 September.

On 19 November 2008, John Sergeant announced that he would be leaving the show because he believed he may "win it".

Series 7 (2009)

The seventh series of Strictly Come Dancing ran from 18 September until 19 December 2009. Tess Daly signed a two-year deal to continue presenting the programme for at least two more series (the 2009 and 2010 series).

On 9 July 2009, it was confirmed that the winner of the 2007 series (Alesha Dixon) would be joining the judging panel and that Darcey Bussell would be a guest judge towards the end of the series run. Dixon replaced Arlene Phillips, who moved to The One Show as a Strictly Come Dancing expert. The BBC was accused of sexism, as none of the male judges on the show had been replaced, and the BBC received over 5,000 complaints. Dixon's fans were also unhappy as she had to cancel a number of dates on her autumn tour to appear on the programme. Karen Hardy, Camilla Dallerup and Hayley Holt did not return this series; they were replaced by Katya Virshilas, Aliona Vilani and Natalie Lowe.

The official lineup was revealed on 25 August 2009 and the winner was BBC Breakfast presenter Chris Hollins:

Series 8 (2010)

The eighth series of Strictly Come Dancing began with a launch show on 11 September 2010; three weeks later, the live shows started on 1 October 2010. Three new professional dancers were announced: Artem Chigvintsev, Jared Murillo and Robin Windsor. Darren Bennett, Lilia Kopylova, Brian Fortuna and Matthew Cutler did not return. The celebrities were revealed on 8 September 2010 and their professional partners were revealed during the launch show.

Series 9 (2011)

Strictly returned with a launch show on 10 September 2011, with the final in December at the Tower Ballroom, Blackpool. Bruce Forsyth and Tess Daly returned to front the main show, and Claudia Winkleman presented the Sunday night results show along with Daly.

For Strictly Come Dancing: It Takes Two, a new presenter joined the team. Winkleman had to pull out of the 2011 series as it would be difficult to do a daily programme so soon after giving birth and was replaced by Zoë Ball.

All of series eight's judges returned to the show. Jennifer Grey served as a cover judge for Len Goodman during week six due to his break from the show. This was the last series to feature Alesha Dixon as a judge after she left the show after the final to become a judge on Britain's Got Talent.

The professional lineup was announced on 15 June 2011, with most of the Series 8 professionals returning except for Jared Murillo, who was replaced by Siberian dancer Pasha Kovalev. The celebrity lineup was announced on 6 September 2011 on The One Show and the couples were paired up for the first time on the launch show.

Series 10 (2012)

The tenth series began on 15 September 2012 with a launch show to reveal the celebrity-professional partnerships, and the live shows began on 5 October.

On 25 April 2012, it was confirmed that Darcey Bussell would be joining the judging panel, replacing Alesha Dixon who left the show to be a judge on Britain's Got Talent.

Katya Virshilas was the only professional dancer not returning this series, and she was replaced by Burn the Floor Karen Hauer. The full lineup was revealed on 10 September during The One Show.

Aliona Vilani was originally Johnny Ball's partner, but injury resulted in her being replaced by Iveta Lukosiute.

Series 11 (2013)

Strictly Come Dancing returned for its eleventh series with a launch show on 7 September 2013 and the live shows on 27 September 2013. Rod Stewart and Jessie J performed on the premiere show.

On 1 June 2013, it was announced that Aliona Vilani, Vincent Simone, Flavia Cacace and Erin Boag would all leave the programme. Aljaž Škorjanec, Emma Slater, Janette Manrara and Iveta Lukosiute, who partnered Johnny Ball in the first few weeks of series 10, would all join the cast. However, it was confirmed on 22 August 2013 that Anya Garnis and Kevin Clifton had joined the series, replacing Slater. On 2 September 2013, it was announced that a foot fracture injury meant that Natalie Lowe would not be able to participate that series, and she was replaced by returning professional Vilani.

Series 12 (2014)

The series started on 7 September 2014 with a launch show, followed by the live shows starting on 26 and 27 September. This series was the first not to be presented by Sir Bruce Forsyth after announcing his departure from the live shows on 4 April (he made his final regular appearance in this series' launch show). However, Forsyth would continue to present special editions of the show, such as Children in Need and Christmas specials. It was announced on 9 May that Claudia Winkleman would join the main show as co-presenter and that her duties would mirror the existing result show format, with Tess Daly taking over Forsyth's role as main presenter and Winkleman taking Daly's role as co-presenter.

It was announced on 1 June 2014 that professional dancers Artem Chigvintsev, James Jordan and Anya Garnis would not be returning for the new series, although Garnis would remain on the show's choreography team. It was also announced that Tristan MacManus and Joanne Clifton would be joining the show's professional line-up. It was then announced in August that Robin Windsor had pulled out of the competition due to a back injury. Windsor was replaced by new professional Trent Whiddon. In week three, entertainer Donny Osmond joined the four regular judges, making the maximum score that week 50 points. Due to Winkleman's absence in weeks 6, 7 and 8, It Takes Two presenter Zoë Ball co-presented with Daly.

Series 13 (2015)

Strictly Come Dancing returned for its thirteenth series with a launch show on 5 September 2015, followed by the live shows starting on 25 and 26 September.

On 23 April 2015, the list of professionals participating in the thirteenth series was revealed. Professionals from the last series who did not return included Trent Whiddon, Iveta Lukosiute and Joanne Clifton. Clifton would remain involved in group dances and would feature on Strictly Come Dancing: It Takes Two as a dance expert. Robin Windsor, absent from the previous series because of injury, also did not return for this series. Three new professional dancers were introduced: Russian dancer Gleb Savchenko (from the American, Australian and Russian versions of Dancing with the Stars), South African dancer Oti Mabuse (from Germany's Let's Dance) and Italian dancer Giovanni Pernice.

On 3 October 2015, the judges performed The Strictly, a signature dance made up of some iconic moves from the show's history for fans to do at home when they hear the theme tune; subsequently, a tutorial for the dance was made available on the show's website and iPlayer hosted by Natalie Lowe and Tristan MacManus.

Series 13 was the last to feature Tristan MacManus, Kristina Rihanoff, Ola Jordan, Gleb Savchenko and Aliona Vilani as professional dancers. Jordan later announced that she had quit the show, claiming that the results were "fixed". Vilani announced three days after winning that she was leaving the show; however, she participated in the 2016 live tour. Savchenko announced that he was leaving the show on 28 June 2016.

Series 14 (2016)

Strictly Come Dancing returned for its fourteenth series with a launch show on 3 September 2016 on BBC One. This was Len Goodman's final series as head judge.

On 28 June 2016, the list of professionals who were returning for the fourteenth series was revealed. Professionals from the last series who would not return included the previous series' champion and two-time professional winner of the show Aliona Vilani, former professional winner Ola Jordan and two-time professional finalist Kristina Rihanoff, as well as Gleb Savchenko and Tristan MacManus. Joanne Clifton returned after a one-series hiatus. The leaving professionals were replaced by Katya Jones, Burn the Floor dancer Gorka Márquez and former Dancing with the Stars US troupe member Oksana Platero. On 26 July 2016, three more new professional dancers — AJ Pritchard, Chloe Hewitt and Neil Jones, husband of new dancer Katya — were announced. Hewitt and Neil Jones did not partner a celebrity as the professionals outnumbered the celebrities, although they were still in group dances and appeared on It Takes Two.

Series 15 (2017)

On 4 May 2017, it was announced that series 7 finalist Natalie Lowe would be departing the show. Five days later, on 9 May, Shirley Ballas announced that she would be replacing Len Goodman as head judge. On 21 June 2017, Oksana Platero and the previous series' professional champion, Joanne Clifton, announced that they would also be leaving. The new professionals replacing them were Australian Open champion Dianne Buswell, Welsh dancer Amy Dowden, and Ukrainian two-time world champion Nadiya Bychkova. On 7 August, Nick Grimshaw announced that Mollie King was the first celebrity known to be taking part in the series. This was the first series to be broadcast since Sir Bruce Forsyth's death in August that year.

In a change to the format of the previous five years, there was no elimination in the final, meaning there were three runner-up couples this series.

Series 16 (2018)

On 30 January 2018, it was announced that Brendan Cole would no longer appear on the show. On 30 May 2018, the full lineup of professional dancers was announced. Chloe Hewitt left the series and three new professional dancers — Graziano Di Prima, Johannes Radebe and Luba Mushtuk — were announced to be joining the show. This meant that there were 18 professional dancers, the most in the show's history.

Series 17 (2019)

On 13 February 2019, professional dancer Pasha Kovalev announced that he was leaving the show after competing on it for eight years. On 10 April 2019, it was announced that judge Darcey Bussell had left the show after seven years. On 22 July 2019, Motsi Mabuse was announced as the replacement for Bussell. On 30 July 2019, it was announced that Nancy Xu would be joining the cast of professional dancers. On 5 September 2019, it was announced that Jamie Laing had withdrawn from the show due to a foot injury. He was later replaced by Kelvin Fletcher. In late October, Will Bayley left the competition due to a sustained leg injury.

Series 18 (2020)

On 6 March 2020, Kevin Clifton announced that he was leaving the show after seven years. On 26 March 2020, AJ Pritchard also announced that he was leaving the show after four years. Due to the COVID-19 pandemic, it was confirmed that the series would be slightly shorter than planned. Before the series began, the professional dancers and some of the crew isolated and tested for COVID-19 to then become a household. Strictly took over a hotel near the studios and the pro dancers learnt and filmed all the group routines for the series at once. This allowed for the show to still include the professional group dances each week. On 21 August 2020, it was announced that Bruno Tonioli would not be on the judging panel but would appear virtually while he filmed Dancing with the Stars in the US. It was the first series since 2012 to begin in October. On 12 November 2020, Nicola Adams and Katya Jones were forced to withdraw from the competition after Jones tested positive for COVID-19. On 19 December 2020, Bill Bailey and Oti Mabuse were crowned the winners of the series, making Mabuse the second professional dancer to win the show twice and the first to win it consecutively, following her 2019 victory. This series featured the first all-female and same-sex partnership of Nicola Adams and Katya Jones.

Series 19 (2021)

On 10 June 2021, it was announced that Janette Manrara would leave the show as a professional dancer and replace Zoe Ball as a new It Takes Two presenter. On 24 June, Anton Du Beke was announced as having joined the judging panel for this series instead of returning as a professional dancer, replacing Bruno Tonioli, who missed a second year due to continuing travel restrictions imposed by the COVID-19 pandemic. In addition to the remaining fourteen professional dancers from Series 18, all of whom returned for this series, four new professional dancers joined the show: Cameron Lombard, Jowita Przystał, Kai Widdrington and Nikita Kuzmin.

This series marked the first time that two contestants withdrew from the competition. On 13 October 2021, Robert Webb withdrew from the competition due to health reasons. On 17 December 2021, AJ Odudu was forced to pull out of the final after tearing a ligament in her right ankle.

The series saw the first couple with a deaf contestant, actress Rose Ayling-Ellis and the first all-male partnership of John Whaite and Johannes Radebe. These contestants all reached the final and they finished as the winner and runner-ups respectively.

Series 20 (2022)

On 22 February 2022, Oti Mabuse announced that she was leaving the show after seven years. On 28 March 2022, it was announced that Aljaž Škorjanec was leaving after nine years of competing on the show. In addition to the remaining sixteen professional dancers from Series 19, all would return in this series, with four new professional dancers joining the show: Carlos Gu, Lauren Oakley, Michelle Tsiakkas and Vito Coppola. This meant that there were 20 professional dancers, the most in the show's history.

On 13 November 2022, Tony Adams and Katya Jones were announced as one of the bottom two couples; however, due to Tony sustaining a hamstring injury from their original performance, they did not compete in the dance-off and withdrew from the competition.

Specials

Since the inception of Strictly Come Dancing in 2004, several special editions of the show have been transmitted by the BBC each year. These have included seasonal specials, charity specials, and variations of the Strictly Come Dancing format.

Strictly Come Dancing Live! 

Strictly Come Dancing Live! is a nationwide arena tour staged every year since 2008.

Statistics

Highest-scoring celebrities
The scores presented below represent the best overall accumulative average scores the celebrities gained each series.

Note: Series 18 was scored out of 30 so scores have been altered to be out of the usual 40.

Female

Male

Lowest-scoring celebrities
The scores presented below represent the worst overall accumulative average score the celebrities gained each series.

Note: Series 18 was scored out of 30 so scores have been altered to be out of the usual 40.

Female

Male

Judges' scores
On 86 occasions, a perfect 40 out of 40 has been awarded inside the main series (including three perfect 50 out of 50s and six perfect 30 out of 30s in Series 7 and Series 18 respectively). Ashley Roberts and Pasha Kovalev hold the record for most perfect scores achieved by an individual couple, with five 40s; Kovalev also holds the record for most perfect scores by a professional dancer, with thirteen. Additionally, another sixteen perfect 40s have been awarded during the Christmas Special episodes. The only dance styles to have never received a perfect score are Rock 'n' Roll, Rumba and Contemporary. Ali Bastian, Tilly Ramsay and Rhys Stephenson are the only contestants to have scored 40 and not made it to the final; AJ Odudu did make it through to the final, but had to withdraw due to an injury. Series 19 champion Rose Ayling-Ellis and Series 12 champion Caroline Flack hold the joint record for the most 40s received by a winner, with 4 each.

Below is a table showing all perfect scores achieved by numerical amount.

By Celebrity:

By Professional:

The lowest score ever given by the judges is 8/40 (1,1,3,3), awarded to Quentin Willson and Hazel Newberry for their Cha-Cha-Cha. Eleven individual scores of 1 have been awarded over the entirety of Strictly Come Dancing, with ten of those coming from Craig Revel Horwood and the other coming from Arlene Phillips. Ann Widdecombe holds the current record for the most 1s, receiving them from Horwood for her Salsa, Samba, and Rumba.

The biggest margin of points awarded between two individual judges' scores is 5, awarded to Jason Wood and Kylie Jones for their Rumba (2,5,7,5), Christopher Parker and Hanna Karttunen for their Tango (2,6,7,6), Fiona Phillips and Brendan Cole for their Rumba (1,2,6,4), Gary Rhodes and Karen Hardy for their Cha-Cha-Cha (1,5,6,5), Scott Maslen and Natalie Lowe for their Rumba (4,9,7,8), Mark Benton and Iveta Lukosiute for their Cha-Cha-Cha (3,8,8,7), Scott Mills and Joanne Clifton for their Samba (2,5,7,5,6 – with the higher vote given by Donny Osmond), Ann Widdecombe and Anton Du Beke for their American Smooth in the 2018 Christmas Special (2,6,7,7) and Dan Walker and Nadiya Bychkova for their American Smooth (4,8,8,9). The biggest margin between two total scores in one week is 27, occurring in the third week of the seventeenth series when Kelvin Fletcher and Oti Mabuse scored 38 and Anneka Rice and Kevin Clifton scored 11.

Alexandra Burke and her partner Gorka Márquez and Ashley Roberts and her partner Pasha Kovalev share the record of most 10s awarded to a couple, with 32. This is followed by Faye Tozer and Giovanni Pernice with 31, then Rose Ayling-Ellis and Giovanni Pernice with 30, then Karim Zeroual and Amy Dowden with 29, then Ricky Whittle and Natalie Lowe and John Whaite and Johannes Radebe each with 28. However, if the four tens given by Darcey Bussell during her tenure as a fifth judge are removed, Whittle is behind Oti Mabuse and her respective celebrity partners Danny Mac and Kelvin Fletcher and Fleur East with Vito Coppola, both with 26 tens, and Rachel Stevens with Vincent Simone and Harry Judd with Aliona Vilani with 25 each. They are followed by Natalie Gumede and Artem Chigvintsev and Ore Oduba and Joanne Clifton and Hamza Yassin and Jowita Przystał with 24 each, Caroline Flack and Pasha Kovalev with 23, Abbey Clancy and Aljaž Škorjanec and Debbie McGee and Giovanni Pernice with 22, Kara Tointon and Artem Chigvintsev with 21 and Lisa Snowdon and Brendan Cole, Kimberley Walsh and Pasha Kovalev and Denise van Outen and James Jordan with 20. Of the above pairings, Snowdon and Cole, Flack and Kovalev, Tozer and Pernice and Roberts and Kovalev are the only pairings to receive straight tens for all of their dances in their respective series finals. Flack and Kovalev, Tozer and Pernice and Roberts and Kovalev are the only pairs to receive three sets of perfect 40s in the final. Of these couples, Roberts and Kovalev and Flack and Kovalev also hold the records for the judges longest consecutive streak of 40s, with four, both stretching from the second performance of the semi-final to the end of the final. Meanwhile, Pernice holds the record for the most 10s received by a professional, with 98, whilst Ayling-Ellis holds the record for the most 10s received by a series champion, with 30.

Roberts and Kovalev also hold the record for the best overall average score from the judges, receiving an average of 36.94/40 for their dances. Natalie Gumede and Artem Chigvintsev, and Danny Mac and Oti Mabuse follow, with averages of 36.88 and 36.62 respectively. Quentin Willson and Hazel Newberry hold the record for the lowest average score, with 8.0/40; they are followed by Susannah Constantine and Anton Du Beke and James Cracknell and Luba Mushtuk, both with an overall average of 12.0/40.

Highest and lowest scoring performances by dance
The best and worst performances in each dance according to the judges' marks (out of 40) are as follows, not including scores earned at Christmas or on any other specials.

For a more accurate comparison Darcey Bussell's scores have been subtracted from the totals of the Series 7 quarter-finalists where relevant; specifically Ali Bastian's American Smooth, Chris Hollins' Charleston and Ricky Whittle's Quickstep; Bussell scored all of them a ten. Whittle's Showdance has not been included as it did not receive the perfect score from Bussell, and therefore cannot be considered the same standard. Seasons having a maximum of 30 points (18) have been converted to a 40-point base.

The Showdance has received the most  perfect scores of any dance, with fifteen; however, if it is disregarded based on being a routine specific to the final, the Charleston has received the most perfect scores of the regularly performed dances, with eleven. Contemporary, Rock 'n' Roll and Rumba are the only dances to have not received the full mark of 40, with the highest score for Contemporary and Rumba being 39 and the highest score for Rock 'n' Roll being 31. However, as Contemporary and Rock ‘n’ Roll are no longer danced on the show, the Rumba is the only dance style which is currently performed to have never received a 40.

Oldest and youngest contestants and series winners
Television presenter Johnny Ball, who was 74 when he competed in 2012, remains the oldest contestant to take part in Strictly Come Dancing; he was older than magician Paul Daniels and actress Lesley Joseph, who were aged 72 and 71 when they competed in 2010 & 2016 respectively. Actress Louisa Lytton, who was 17 when she competed in 2006, remains the youngest ever contestant.

Comedian Bill Bailey, who was 55 when he competed in 2020, is the oldest series winner, while gymnast Louis Smith, who was 23 when he competed in 2012, is the youngest series winner. At 19, Maisie Smith is the youngest contestant to make it to the final, while at the age of 61, Dr. Pamela Stephenson remains the oldest.

Other series statistics
Series 8 quarter-finalist Ann Widdecombe holds the record for the most lowest-scoring dances, with her highest score given being 21/40 and her lowest being 12/40.

Series 13 contestant Jamelia holds the record for being in the most dance-offs, which is 5, and shares the record for surviving the most dance-offs with series 18 runner-up, Jamie Laing and series 20 runners-up Molly Rainford and Fleur East, which is 4. Series 1 semi-finalist Lesley Garrett, Series 11 contestant Mark Benton and Series 17 contestant Mike Bushell share the record for being in the most consecutive bottom twos, which is 4.

Series 18 finalist HRVY and Series 19 champion Rose Ayling-Ellis share the record for the earliest ever perfect score in the competition, both earned in Week 6 for their Street/Commercial and Tango respectively.

Controversies

Phone voting
On 13 December 2008, Strictly Come Dancing became the subject of press attention and viewer complaints about an error in the voting system during the semi-final of series six. In the show, three couples remained in the competition. After all three had performed and the judges had given their scores, two of the couples were in joint-first position on the leaderboard, while the third — Tom Chambers and Camilla Dallerup — were in last place. This meant that, no matter how many public votes were cast in their favour, it was mathematically impossible for the third-placed couple to remain in the competition. This oversight was initially unnoticed by producers until after the public vote became live and viewers were invited to call in and save their favourites at a cost of 15p per vote. Once the mistake was finally realised and the public vote was closed, it was announced that all three couples would be put through to the final, all the votes already cast would count towards the final result of the competition, and viewers could apply for a refund if they wished.

The BBC received 1800 complaints about the incident, while media regulator Ofcom received 297. Jon Beazley, the BBC's Head of Entertainment Production, was interviewed on Strictly's spin-off show Strictly Come Dancing: It Takes Two on 15 December. He apologised for the oversight, referring to it as an "unprecedented situation". On the same day, the BBC posted a statement on its website, which clarified that an independent adjudicator had been consulted to reach a solution that would offer "fairness to the viewers who voted and the contestants themselves". The BBC also stated that, following the mistake, "the voting and judging mechanisms used in all BBC voting programmes [had] been thoroughly examined".

After conducting an investigation, Ofcom concluded that "the mistake had resulted from an oversight, rather than any shortcomings in the technical arrangements for voting or in the handling of votes received", and that they were "satisfied that appropriate steps were taken by the BBC and the disadvantage to viewers minimised". Ofcom also opined that "the BBC had been open and transparent with viewers about the mistake it made and the solution adopted".

Arlene Phillips / Alesha Dixon
In June 2009, tabloid newspaper The Sun reported that the then 66-year-old judge Arlene Phillips, who had judged the show since its inception in 2004, was to be replaced by series five winner Alesha Dixon, then aged 30. This was later confirmed by the BBC in July of that year. Subsequently, the BBC was accused of ageism and sexism by several sources, an accusation the corporation has faced before over the removal of several older female presenters, including Moira Stuart, Juliet Morris, Miriam O'Reilly, Michaela Strachan, Charlotte Smith and Anna Ford. The BBC denied the allegations that the decision to remove Phillips was due to her age.

Furthermore, Dixon herself was criticised after the debut episode of the seventh series, the first to feature her as a judge. A total of 272 complaints were received by the BBC – bringing the total number about Dixon joining the programme to over 4000 – along with over 5000 comments on Strictly Come Dancing's internet message board. Dixon was compared unfavourably to Phillips, with claims that the former was "unsuitable", "unqualified" and lacked "knowledge, experience and talent". However, Dixon was praised and defended from her critics by the BBC, by fellow judge Craig Revel Horwood and by Phillips herself.

Race row
In 2009, during the seventh series, professional dancer Anton Du Beke issued a public apology for his use of a racial slur during a conversation with his dance partner Laila Rouass. Du Beke claimed that the comment, which was never broadcast, was a joke referring to Rouass' spray-tan, in which he said that she "looked like a Paki". Over 600 complaints were received by the BBC, including those about comments Bruce Forsyth, then host of Strictly Come Dancing, made about the controversy on a Talksport radio programme, in which he suggested that Britain "used to have a sense of humour" about such incidents, and that Du Beke's apology should be accepted.

Following the incident, and Forsyth's response, the BBC stated:Racially offensive language in the workplace is entirely unacceptable. Anton was right to apologise quickly and without reservation and Laila has wholly accepted his apology. Everyone is very clear that there can be no repetition of this behaviour.Forsyth also clarified his position:What Anton said to Laila was wrong and he has apologised unreservedly for this. Nor do I in any way excuse or condone the use of such language. To be absolutely clear, the use of racially offensive language is never either funny or acceptable. However, there is a major difference between this and racist comments which are malicious in intent and whilst I accept that we live in a world of extraordinary political correctness, we should keep things in perspective.

Same-sex couples

In 2015, in an interview with the Daily Mirror, CJ de Mooi said that he was turned down for the show because he had wanted to dance with a same-sex partner.  The BBC denied that de Mooi had ever been under consideration for the show, and also declared that "Strictly is a family show and we have chosen the traditional format of mixed-sex couples". The press has reported on the issue on numerous occasions when gay celebrities have appeared on the show, including Will Young, Susan Calman, Robert Rinder, Richard Coles and Ranj Singh. Strictly Come Dancing judges Shirley Ballas and Craig Revel Horwood have both expressed their support for introducing same-sex couples.

Same-sex partnerships have been featured on several international versions of the show, including Austria (2011), Italy (2015), Australia (2019) and Germany (2019). On 3 November 2019, Johannes Radebe and fellow professional Graziano Di Prima performed together to Emeli Sande's "Shine" on the Sunday results episode, the show's first individual same-sex dance. On 2 September 2020, it was announced that boxer Nicola Adams would feature in the show's first same-sex couple for its eighteenth series. She was partnered with professional dancer Katya Jones. In 2021, it was announced that John Whaite would feature in the first all-male same-sex couple with Johannes Radebe for the nineteenth series. The United States version of the show would also have a same-sex couple that same year, with JoJo Siwa & Jenna Johnson. Series 20 also included
same-sex partnerships with Richie Anderson and Giovanni Pernice in an all-male partnership and Jayde Adams and Karen Hauer in an all-female partnership.

Strictly curse
The so-called "Strictly curse" has been blamed for the number of affairs and relationship break-ups that have occurred during or soon after taking part in the show. The first such incident was the suggested affair between dancer Brendan Cole and newsreader Natasha Kaplinsky during the initial series: they both denied the affair, but the surrounding controversy resulted in the ending of both their long-term relationships.

COVID vaccinations
In September 2021, The Sun reported that at least three unnamed professional dancers had allegedly refused to get a COVID vaccine. A report in The Times claimed The Mail on Sunday had attempted to name some of the unvaccinated dancers but was met with "strong pushback" from their lawyers. Amy Dowden, Oti Mabuse, and Giovanni Pernice have all publicly confirmed that they are vaccinated.

Judges Shirley Ballas, Motsi Mabuse, and Craig Revel Horwood are all vaccinated.

Ratings
An example of Strictly Come Dancings popularity is that, after episodes, electricity use in the United Kingdom rises significantly as viewers who have waited for the show to end begin boiling water for tea, a phenomenon known as TV pick-up. National Grid personnel watch the show to know when closing credits begin so they can prepare for the surge.

All ratings are from BARB. Series averages exclude Christmas special and launch show.

Awards
The show has won a highly prestigious Rose D'Or award for 'Best Variety Show', beating off competition from reality shows from twelve other different countries. It has also won two awards for 'Best Reality Show' at the TRIC Awards and two at the TV Quick Awards for 'Best Talent Show'. It has also received four BAFTA Award nominations.

The show won the award of 'Most Popular Talent Show' at the National Television Awards in 2008, 2013, 2014, 2016, 2017, 2018, 2019, 2020, 2021 and 2022.

In the Guinness Book of World Records 2010 edition, the format of Strictly Come Dancing was named the most successful television show with the format being sold to more than 38 countries worldwide.

Strictly Come Dancing: The Game
In 2016, BBC Worldwide commissioned a match-3 mobile app game published by Donut Publishing and developed by Exient Entertainment. The game uses a mix of hand animation and motion-captured data for all the dances in the game, using pro dancers from the show (Chloe Hewitt and Neil Jones). The mo-cap process was featured on It Takes Two in the build-up to the release of the app. The game features over 150 dresses and 9 dances: Quickstep, Jive, Tango, Salsa, Charleston, Viennese Waltz, Rumba, Cha Cha Cha, and Paso Doble. It was released on the App Store and Google Play in early 2016 and is regularly updated with new dance features alongside new seasons of the show.

See also

 Just the Two of Us (TV series) – the same format, with singing instead of dancing
 Let's Dance for Comic Relief

References

Further reading
 Smith, Rupert (2005) Strictly Come Dancing; dance consultant: Len Goodman. London: BBC Books

External links
 
 
 
 Strictly Come Dancing Biogs.com

 
2004 British television series debuts
2010s British television series
2020s British television series
Ballroom dance
English-language television shows
Television series produced at Pinewood Studios
 
Television series by BBC Studios
Television shows shot at Elstree Film Studios